Lecce suffered a very bad season start, with an elimination in Coppa Italia and 9 losses in 13 league matches. On 3 December, the manager Eusebio Di Francesco was sacked: Serse Cosmi was appointed new coach. After his arrival, the side began to struggle in the attempt to avoid relegation and although gaining a notable number of points in the following months, did not manage to escape, mainly due to four losses in the last five matches, being relegated to Serie B.

Squad

Out on loan

Transfers

Summer

In:

Out:

Winter

In:

Out:

Competitions

Serie A

Results summary

Results by round

Fixtures & results

Notes
The Serie A game against Napoli was postponed due to the death of Livorno's Piermario Morosini

League table

Coppa Italia

Squad statistics

Appearances and goals

|-
|colspan="14"|Players who appeared for Lecce no longer at the club:

|}

Top scorers

Disciplinary record

References

U.S. Lecce seasons
Lecce